The 2019 season was the 61st season of competitive association football in Ecuador.

National teams

Ecuador national football team

Friendly matches

2019 Copa América

Group C

Ecuador national under-20 football team

2019 South American U-20 Championship

Group B

Final stage

2019 FIFA U-20 World Cup

Group B

Knockout stage

Ecuador national under-23 football team

2019 Pan American Games

Group A

CONMEBOL competitions

2019 CONMEBOL Copa Libertadores

2019 CONMEBOL Copa Sudamericana

Men's football

2019 Campeonato Ecuatoriano de Fútbol

Serie A

First stage

Play-offs

Serie B

Aggregate table

Play-offs

Segunda Categoría

Final stage

Copa Ecuador

Women's football

Súperliga Femenina

References